The National Archives of Tunisia (French: Archives nationales de Tunisie) (est. 1988) is headquartered in Tunis on the Boulevard 9 avril 1938. Among its holdings are materials generated by various government offices, such as the president, prime minister, and ministries of agriculture, commerce, culture, education, finance, health, social affairs, and transport.

History
The Centre des correspondences de l’Etat formed in 1874, and became Archives générales du gouvernement in 1883. The archives became a "public institution in accordance with the stipulations of Act n° 88-95" in 1988. Its headquarters moved from the office of the prime minister in 1999 to its current building, designed by Samy Ateb and Fethi El Bahri. It is near the national library. Directors have included Moncef Fakhfakh (1986-circa 1993?) and Hédi Jallab (2011-circa 2016?).

See also
 National Library of Tunisia

References

Bibliography

External links

 Official site

Tunisia
Government of Tunisia
History of Tunisia
Organisations based in Tunis
Buildings and structures in Tunis
1988 establishments in Tunisia
1874 establishments